Arechi may refer to:

 Archi, Iran, a village in Karipey Rural District, Lalehabad District, Babol County, Mazandaran Province, Iran
 Arechis I of Benevento (died 641), duke of Benevento
 Arechis II of Benevento (died 787), duke of Benevento
 Stadio Arechi, a multi-purpose stadium in Salerno, Italy, named after Arechis II of Benevento
 Arechi, a Japanese literary journal; see Ryūichi Tamura